David Berganio Jr. (born January 14, 1969) is an American professional golfer who currently plays on the PGA Tour.

Berganio was born in Los Angeles, California. He won the U.S. Amateur Public Links twice (1991 and 1993) while playing college golf at the University of Arizona. He turned professional in 1993 after playing on the Walker Cup team.

Berganio has played on the Nationwide Tour (1996, 1998–2000), winning three times, and the PGA Tour (1997, 2001–03, 2009). His best finish on the PGA Tour came at the 2002 Bob Hope Chrysler Classic where he lost a playoff to Phil Mickelson. In 2003, he suffered from a bulging disk in his back and played on a Major Medical Extension (11 events from 2004 to 2008). At the 2008 qualifying school, he finished T7 to earn a full card for the 2009 season.

Berganio received attention after he withdrew from the 2019 Rocket Mortgage Classic. His decision allowed Nate Lashley to enter the tournament and win.

Amateur wins (3)
1991 Pacific Coast Amateur, U.S. Amateur Public Links
1993 U.S. Amateur Public Links

Professional wins (3)

Buy.com Tour wins (3)

Buy.com Tour playoff record (1–0)

Playoff record
PGA Tour playoff record (0–1)

U.S. national team appearances
Amateur
Walker Cup: 1993 (winners)

Results in major championships

CUT = missed the half-way cut
"T" = Tied
Note: Berganio never played in The Open Championship or the PGA Championship.

See also
1996 Nike Tour graduates
2000 Buy.com Tour graduates
2008 PGA Tour Qualifying School graduates

References

External links

American male golfers
Arizona Wildcats men's golfers
PGA Tour golfers
Korn Ferry Tour graduates
Golfers from Los Angeles
People from Sylmar, Los Angeles
1969 births
Living people